Dr. Tan Loke Mun is the founder Director of ArchiCentre Sdn. Bhd, DTLM Design Group and principal of DrTanLM Architect, architectural design studios in Subang Jaya, Malaysia. He is best known for having designed the first Green Building Index Platinum rated house in Malaysia, the S11 House.

Biography
Born and raised in Petaling Jaya, Malaysia, Tan obtained his architectural training from Deakin University, Australia in the 1980s and later received his doctorate from The University of Melbourne, Australia. His doctoral studies was in social and self-help housing and he has worked in many urban and rural parts of Australia, Uruguay and Argentina.

He founded ArchiCentre in 1994.

He is a past president of the Malaysian Institute of Architects 2005-2007 (PAM), team leader who set up Green Building Index Malaysia (GBI), past chairman of the LAM-PAM Green Building and Sustainability Committee, past member of the GBI Accreditation Panel (GBIAP) and also a member of the Board of Architects Malaysia.

The S11 House is Malaysia’s first Green Building Index Platinum rated work for domestic architecture. It won the Tropical Building Category of the Asean Energy Awards in 2013, the Futurarc Green Leadership Award 2012, Gold medal in the Edge-PAM Green Home Award 2011,  Gold Medal for the PAM-Edge Residential Award 2011, Winner of PAM Architectural Steel Colourbond Award 2011, Gold winner for Residential and Sustainable Categories of Asia Pacific Design Excellence Awards 2011 and Finalist for World Architecture Festival (WAF) Awards 2012. The S11 House while not the firm's largest project, it has been one of the firm's biggest ideological successes.

Tan's works are widely published and he has received numerous architectural awards for his works. He lectures widely on architecture and design, and is adjunct professor at University Tun Hussein Onn Malaysia, and also industry advisor to Taylors University and Tunku Abdul Rahman University College.

Life and career
  
Tan is the founding Director of ArchiCentre Sdn. Bhd. The practice was formed in 1994.

Professional qualifications and affiliations

B.A (Arch), B Arch (Hons), PhD (Melb), FPAM (Fellow Member), RAIA (Hon. Member), ASA (Hon. Member), MIID, MMIArbs

Director, ArchiCentre Sdn. Bhd, DTLM Design Group Sdn. Bhd.

Principal, DrTanLM Architect

Past President, Pertubuhan Akitek Malaysia (PAM) 2005/2007

Board Member, Board of Architects Malaysia (LAM)

Board Member, Board of Engineers Malaysia (BEM)

Adjunct Professor, Department of Building Management, University Tun Hussein Onn Malaysia

Industry Advisory Panel, Taylors University

Industry Expert Advisory Panel (IEAP), Tunku Abdul Rahman University College

Fellow Member, Pertubuhan Akitek Malaysia (PAM)

Adjunct Professor of Architecture, University Putra Malaysia (2010 - 2014)

Board Member, Green Building Index Accreditation Panel (2009 - 2014)

Council Member of Pertubuhan Akitek Malaysia (PAM) (1997 - 2011)

President, Pertubuhan Akitek Malaysia (PAM) (2005 - 2007)

Immediate Past President, Pertubuhan Akitek Malaysia (PAM) (2007 - 2009)

Deputy President, Pertubuhan Akitek Malaysia (PAM) (2004 - 2005)

Vice-President, Pertubuhan Akitek Malaysia (PAM) (2003 - 2004)

Hon. Secretary, Pertubuhan Akitek Malaysia (PAM) (2001 - 2003)

Board Member of Lembaga Arkitek Malaysia (LAM) (2003 - current)

Disciplinary Committee Member, Lembaga Arkitek Malaysia (LAM) (2005 - current)

Member, Council of Architectural Education Malaysia (CAEM) (1999 - 2001, 2003 - 2004)

Committee Chairman, Continuing Professional Development (CPD - LAM) (2003 - 2007)

Hon. Secretary, Architects Regional Council of Asia (ARCASIA) (1998 - 2000)

Council Member, Malaysian Institute of Arbitrators (MiArbs) (1998 - 2004)

Hon. Treasurer, (MiArbs) (2000 - 2004)

Disciplinary Committee Member, BAR Council (2008 - current)

Council Member, Malaysian Institute of Interior Designers (IPDM) (2005 - 2010)

Hon. Treasurer, Malaysian Institute of Interior Designers (IPDM) (2006 - 2008)

Chairman, LAM PAM Sustainability Committee (2009 - 2011)

Board Member, Malaysian Green Building Confederation, MGBC (2010 - 2011)

Honorary Member, Royal Australian Institute of Architects (RAIA) (2006-)

Honorary Member, Association of Siamese Architects (ASA) (2009-)

Asia Pacific Representative of the World Green Building Council (WGBC) (2009 - 2012)

Board Member, Board of Engineers Malaysia (BEM) (2013/2014) (2014 - 2016)

Planning Advisory Board Member to the Minister of Federal Territories, Malaysia

Fellow Member, Pertubuhan Akitek Malaysia (PAM) (2015 - current)

Exhibitions

2010, Aug – Nov, The Green Tower – Remixed, Venice Biennale Architettura 2010, Venice, Italy

2012, Aug – Oct, PAX2012, Putra Architectural Exhibition, Galeri Serdang, University Putra Malaysia, Kuala Lumpur

2012, Aug – Nov, Air Craft – Malaysian Voices, Venice Biennale Architettura 2012, Common Ground, Venice, Italy

2013, March, Air Craft – Malaysian Voices, Venice Biennale 2013 Malaysia Pavilion, University Putra Malaysia

2013, 26–28 April, Architecture For All, Werdhapura Village, Sanur-Bali, Indonesia

2013, 19–22 June, KLAF 2013 – PAM Model Exhibition “Ineffable Space”, Kuala Lumpur Convention Centre, Kuala

Lumpur, Malaysia

2013, 22–27 October, [KIA] 100 Architects of the Year 2013, Dongdaemun History and Culture Park, Seoul, Korea

2014, 1–4 May, PAM-HOMEDEC Awards for Residential Renovation, Gold Recipient, ArchiCentre Sdn Bhd - A Solo

Exhibition, Kuala Lumpur Convention Centre, Kuala Lumpur, Malaysia

2014, 1–4 May, Exhibition Preview of Sufficiency – 14 th International Architecture Exhibition, Venice Biennale 2014 -

Malaysia Pavilion, Kuala Lumpur Convention Centre, Kuala Lumpur, Malaysia

2014, June – Nov, The T-Colony – Sufficiency, Venice Biennale Architettura 2014, Venice, Italy

2015, January, The T-Colony – Sufficiency, VB2014 Returning Exhibition at Taylors University Gallery, Petaling Jaya

2015, 12–15 August, KLAF 2015 – PAM Model Exhibition “Eccentric Spaces Or Details” at Kuala Lumpur Convention Centre, Kuala Lumpur, Malaysia

2015, 21-25 Oct,    [KIA] 100 Architects of the Year 2015, Culture Station Seoul 284, Seoul, Korea

2016, 25–30 July,   KLAF 2016 – PAM Architectural Exhibition “ Future Communities” at PAM Center, Jalan Tanduk, Bangsar, Kuala Lumpur, Malaysia (in conjunction with KLAF 2016 and soft launch of new PAM Center Jln Tandok)

References

1965 births
People from Selangor
Living people
Deakin University alumni
Malaysian architects
Malaysian people of Chinese descent